Cleary is an unincorporated community and census-designated place in Rankin County, Mississippi, United States. Per the 2020 census, the population was 1,688.

Geography

Demographics

2020 census

Note: the US Census treats Hispanic/Latino as an ethnic category. This table excludes Latinos from the racial categories and assigns them to a separate category. Hispanics/Latinos can be of any race.

References

Unincorporated communities in Rankin County, Mississippi
Unincorporated communities in Mississippi
Census-designated places in Rankin County, Mississippi
Census-designated places in Mississippi